Ooh La La or Ooh La La La may refer to:

Film and television
 "Ooh La La" (Odd Man Out episode), the final episode of the British sitcom Odd Man Out
 Ooh La La La (film), a 2012 Tamil film
Ooh La La, a 1960s and 1970s BBC television series by Caryl Brahms and Ned Sherrin based on the plays of Georges Feydeau

Music

Albums

 Ooh La La (Faces album) or the title song (see below), 1973
 Ooh La La (Suzi Lane album) or the title song, 1979
 Oooh La La! (Crash Test Dummies album), 2010
 Ooh La La: An Island Harvest, by Ronnie Lane, 2014

Songs
 "Ooh La La" (Britney Spears song), 2013
 "Ooh La La" (Coolio song), 1997
 "Ooh La La" (Faces song), 1973
 "Ooh La La" (Goldfrapp song), 2005
 "Ooh La La" (Jessie Ware song), 2020
 "Ooh La La" (Shreya Ghoshal and Bappi Lahiri song), 2011
 "Ooh La La" (The Wiseguys song), 1998
 "Oh La La La" (TC Matic song), 1981
 "Oh La La La" (2 Eivissa song), 1997
 "Ooo La La La" (Teena Marie song), 1988
 "Paris (Ooh La La)", by Grace Potter and the Nocturnals, 2010
 "Uh La La La", by Alexia, 1997
 "Ooh La La", by April Stevens with Nino Tempo, 1966
 "Ooh La La", by Bolland & Bolland, 1973
 "Ooh La La", by Frankie Avalon, B-side of "DeDe Dinah", 1957
 "Ooh La La", by JJ Cale from Rewind: The Unreleased Recordings, 2007
 "Ooh La La", by Jobriath, 1974
 "Ooh La La", by John Cale from John Cale Comes Alive, 1984
 "Ooh La La", by Johnny Pearson, 1962
 "Ooh La La", by Normie Rowe, 1966
 "Ooh La La", by Ohio Express, 1970
 "Ooh La La", by Run the Jewels, featuring Greg Nice and DJ Premier from RTJ4, 2020
 "Ooh La La", by Sonu Kakkar, Neha Kakkar, and Tony Kakkar from the film Shubh Mangal Zyada Saavdhan, 2020
 "Ooh La La", by Steel Magnolia from Steel Magnolia, 2011
 "Ooh La La", by Tinashe from Joyride, 2018
 "Ooh La La", by the Venetians, 1984
 "Ooh La-La!", by Girls' Generation from Girls' Generation, 2007
 "Ooh La La (I Can't Get over You)", by Perfect Gentlemen, 1990
 "Oo La La La", by Cheap Trick from One on One, 1982
 "Ooh La La La", by Exo from Don't Mess Up My Tempo, 2018
 "Ooh La La La", by Nobody's Angel from Nobody's Angel, 2000
 "Ooh La La La La", by Nadel Paris, 2017
 "Ooh Ooh La La La", by The Raincoats from Moving, 1983
 "Ooo La La", by Robin Thicke from Blurred Lines, 2013
 "Oo La La Hugh", by Sting, from his EP The Soul Cages and the 2021 expanded reissue edition of his album The Soul Cages, 1991
 "(Let's Go Dancing) Ooh La La La", by Kool & the Gang from As One, 1982
 "Manna Madurai (Ooh La La La)", by Unni Menon, K. S. Chitra, and Srinivas from the film Minsara Kanavu, 1997